Vardim Rocks (‘Skali Vardim’ ska-'li 'var-dim) are a group of rocks situated on the south side of Hell Gates, facing Devils Point in the southwest extremity of Byers Peninsula on Livingston Island in the South Shetland Islands, Antarctica.  Extending  in east-west direction.  The two principal islets in the group, Demon and Sprite, are extending  and  respectively, with surface area of the former .  The area was visited by early 19th century sealers.

The group includes the small islands of Demon, Sprite, and Imp.

The rocks are named after the village of Vardim and the neighboring Vardim Island which is located on the Danube River in northern Bulgaria. Demon, Sprite and Imp islands are so named to reflect their proximity to Devils Point.

Location

Maps
 Península Byers, Isla Livingston. Mapa topográfico a escala 1:25000. Madrid: Servicio Geográfico del Ejército, 1992.
 L.L. Ivanov. Antarctica: Livingston Island and Greenwich, Robert, Snow and Smith Islands. Scale 1:120000 topographic map. Troyan: Manfred Wörner Foundation, 2010.  (First edition 2009. )
 Antarctic Digital Database (ADD). Scale 1:250000 topographic map of Antarctica. Scientific Committee on Antarctic Research (SCAR). Since 1993, regularly upgraded and updated.
 L.L. Ivanov. Antarctica: Livingston Island and Smith Island. Scale 1:100000 topographic map. Manfred Wörner Foundation, 2017.

See also 
 Composite Antarctic Gazetteer
 List of Antarctic islands south of 60° S
 SCAR
 Territorial claims in Antarctica

Notes

References
 Bulgarian Antarctic Gazetteer. Antarctic Place-names Commission. (details in Bulgarian, basic data in English)

External links
 Vardim Rocks. Copernix satellite image

Rock formations of Livingston Island
Bulgaria and the Antarctic